Sekolah Menengah Kebangsaan Puchong Perdana (English: Puchong Perdana Secondary School) also known as SMKPP and SMK Puchong Perdana is a school located in Puchong, Selangor, Malaysia.  The school was established in 1996 and was among the first schools in Puchong and located in Puchong Perdana.

Co-Curricular 
SMK Puchong Perdana is a school that is active in various extra-curricular activities, sports, and often involved in various programs such as camps, trips, and competitions between schools.

Among the most popular sport in this school, and often find success in school and district is taekwondo, hockey, bowling, football, hockey and swimming.  The school team is among the most powerful and feared in the state as often won the hockey tournament every year. In its first participation in Selangor State Hockey Competition, SMKPP beat Sekolah Seri Serdang (1-0; goal scored by Inderan from a penalty corner deflection) in the final and represented Selangor in the Champions School Tournament in 1999. Sir Muhammad Kamarul Kabilan, an English teacher then at SMKPP, introduced hockey to a group of boys who were wasting their time at school in the afternoon. From a small group of 5  to 7 boys, hockey became a viral sport at school where everybody started playing hockey during PE class, as well as in their free time. In addition the school was also successful in the traditional dance is represented by male and female students from Form 1-4. Sport in this school is dominated by red house won the overall event, in front of the green, blue and yellow.

Anthem

Malay 
Warga sekolah ada wawasan,
Ingin menjadi insan cermelang,
Berilmu, berdisiplin, dan berbakti,
Itulah amalan yang murni.

SMK Puchong Perdana,             
Kebanggan kita bersama,
Sekolah unggul visi utama,
Penjana jenerasi ternama,
Penjana jenerasi ternama.

English 
School staff have a vision,
Determination to be well balanced,
Knowledgeable, disciplined, dutiful,
That our students.

SMK Puchong Perdana,
Proud of us,
Ideal vision of the school principal,
Prominent human generator,
Prominent human generator.

Motto 
Berilmu, Berdisiplin, Berbakti (English: Knowledgeable, Discipline, Serve)

See also 
 Puchong
 Puchong Perdana
 Education in Malaysia

Petaling District
Schools in Selangor
Secondary schools in Malaysia